K. Sundar (born 5 June 1954) is an Indian politician from Tamil Nadu and the Member of the Legislative Assembly of Tamil Nadu for the Uthiramerur Constituency.
He's also the District Secretary of the Dravida Munnetra Kazhagam (DMK) political party, for the Kanchipuram South region. He was elected to the Tamil Nadu legislative assembly from Uthiramerur constituency as a Dravida Munnetra Kazhagam candidate in 1989, 1996, 2006,2016 and for the fifth time in the 2021 election.

Early life and family 
Sundar is the first son of S.C. Kannan and Thiripura Sundari Ammal. He was born in Salavakkam on 5 June 1954. Sundar studied at the Salavakkam High School. He completed his undergraduate course and holds a Maths degree from Pachaiyappa's College, Chennai of University of Madras.
Sundar married K.S. Vasantharani on March 4, 1983 and has two children. His son is S. Vetriselvan, his daughter is Porchelvi.

Politics 
His political career began when, as an 11-year-old, he started with Hindi agitation. He continued his support to Dravida Munnetra Kazhagam during his college days Pachaiyappa's College, Chennai 1972. After his graduation he kept working for Dravida Munnetra Kazhagam. Meanwhile, he also served as the Panchayat president of Salavakkam in the year 1986 and he became the Secretary for Dravida Munnetra Kazhagam, Uthiramerur Union in 1988.

Electoral performance

References 

Dravida Munnetra Kazhagam politicians
Living people
Tamil Nadu MLAs 1996–2001
Tamil Nadu MLAs 2006–2011
Tamil Nadu MLAs 2016–2021
Tamil Nadu MLAs 2021–2026
1954 births